Aeronautical earth station (also: aeronautical earth radio station) is – according to Article 1.82 of the International Telecommunication Union's (ITU) ITU Radio Regulations (RR) – defined as «An earth station in the fixed-satellite service, or, in some cases, in the aeronautical mobile-satellite service, located at a specified fixed point on land to provide a feeder link for the aeronautical mobile-satellite service.»

Each station shall be classified by the service in which it operates permanently or temporarily.
See also

Classification
In accordance with ITU Radio Regulations (article 1) this type of radio station might be classified as follows: 
Earth station (article 1.63)
Mobile earth station (article 1.68) of the mobile-satellite service (article 1.25)
Land earth station (article 1.70) of the fixed-satellite service (article 1.21) or mobile-satellite service
Land mobile earth station (article 1.74) of the land mobile-satellite service (article 1.27)
Base earth station (article 1.72) of the fixed-satellite service
Coast earth station (article 1.76) of the fixed-satellite service / mobile-satellite service
Ship earth station (article 1.78) of the mobile-satellite service
Aeronautical earth station
Aircraft earth station (article 1.84) of the aeronautical mobile-satellite service (article 1.35)

References / sources 

 International Telecommunication Union (ITU)

Radio stations and systems ITU
Air traffic control